Leichter is a German word meaning "lighter". It is also a surname and may refer to:

Franz S. Leichter (born 1930), politician in the New York State Assembly and Senate
Hope Jensen Leichter, American educationalist
Karl Leichter (1902–1987), Estonian musicologist
Käthe Leichter (1895–1942), Austrian economist, women's rights activist, journalist, politician
Max Leichter (1920–1981), German wrestler

See also
Käthe Leichter Prize, the Austrian State Prize for women's research, gender studies and gender equality in the workplace
Leicht

German-language surnames